Cyperus urbani, commonly known as Urban's sedge, is a species of sedge that is endemic to Puerto Rico.

The species was first formally described by the botanist Johann Otto Boeckeler in 1888. The specific epithet commemorates the German botanist Ignatz Urban, who specialised in the flora of the Caribbean.

See also 
 List of Cyperus species

References 

urbani
Taxa named by Johann Otto Boeckeler
Plants described in 1888
Flora of Puerto Rico
Flora without expected TNC conservation status